Pseudophaeobacter arcticus is a psychrophilic, Gram-negative, rod-shaped and motile bacteria from the genus of Pseudophaeobacter which has been isolated from the Arctic.

References 

Rhodobacteraceae
Bacteria described in 2008